Henicops howensis is a species of centipede in the Henicopidae family. It is endemic to Australia. It was first described in 2004 by Gregory Edgecombe.

Distribution
The species occurs only on New South Wales’ Lord Howe Island in the Tasman Sea.

References

 

 
howensis
Centipedes of Australia
Endemic fauna of Australia
Fauna of Lord Howe Island
Animals described in 2004
Taxa named by Gregory Edgecombe